Doloroso is an unincorporated community in Wilkinson County, Mississippi, United States near the county seat Woodville and the Homochitto National Forest. The community rests on U.S. Route 61.

Notable people
 Catherine Stokes, is a retired deputy director of the Illinois Department of Public Health and a community volunteer. She is a pioneering African-American member of the Church of Jesus Christ of Latter-day Saints.

References

Unincorporated communities in Wilkinson County, Mississippi
Unincorporated communities in Mississippi